Michael Samuel (born 22 April 1980 in Amsterdam) is a Dutch footballer who played for Eerste Divisie clubs Stormvogels Telstar and Go Ahead Eagles during the 2001-2007 football seasons.

References

Dutch footballers
Footballers from Amsterdam
SC Telstar players
Go Ahead Eagles players
1980 births
Eerste Divisie players
Living people
Association footballers not categorized by position